Vingerhoedtia grisea is a moth in the family Bombycidae. It was described by Max Gaede in 1927. It is found in Cameroon.

References

Endemic fauna of Cameroon
Bombycidae
Moths described in 1927